Kepler-61b (also known by its Kepler Object of Interest designation KOI-1361.01) is a super-Earth exoplanet orbiting within parts of the habitable zone of the K-type main-sequence star Kepler-61. It is located about 1,100 light-years (338 parsecs) from Earth in the constellation of Cygnus. It was discovered in 2013 using the transit method, in which the dimming effect that a planet causes as it crosses in front of its star is measured, by NASA's Kepler spacecraft.

Characteristics

Mass, radius and temperature
Kepler-61b is a super-Earth, an exoplanet with a radius and mass bigger than Earth, but smaller than that of the ice giants Neptune and Uranus. It has a radius of 2.15 . The mass of Kepler-61b is 6.65 . At 2.15 radius and with a 6.65 mass its density would come to around 3.6 g/cm3 or slightly below the 3.9 g/cm3 of Mars. This planet may also have some "volatile" make up or be an ocean planet to explain the lower density.

Host star

The planet orbits a (K-type) star named Kepler-61. The star has a mass of 0.63  and a radius of 0.62 . It has a temperature of 4017 K and is about 1 billion years old. In comparison, the Sun is 4.6 billion years old and has a temperature of 5778 K.

The star's apparent magnitude, or how bright it appears from Earth's perspective, is 15. Therefore, it is too dim to be seen with the naked eye.

Orbit
Kepler-61b orbits its host star with about 8% of the Sun's luminosity with an orbital period of 59.877 days and an orbital radius of about 0.28 times that of Earth's (compared to Mercury from the Sun, which is about 0.38 AU). It has an eccentricity of near 0.25, meaning its orbit is mildly elliptical. It receives 27% more sunlight that Earth does.

Habitability

Kepler-61b is located in the inner part of the empirical habitable zone, a zone where liquid water could exist with high albedo, relatively low humidity and higher atmospheric pressure. However, the planet is likely tidally locked because of its close distance to its host star.

If Kepler-61b has a rocky surface, it is a good candidate for life, because the system is about one billion years old. Because of its radius (2.24 ), it is likely gaseous, with no solid surface. However, this does not totally destroy the chances of habitability in the Kepler-61 system. For instance, Kepler-61b may have a large, Earth-like moon (with the proper atmospheric properties and pressure), capable of supporting surface liquid water, and potentially life. Any such moon would have to have originated as a smaller planet, that has been captured by Kepler-61b, since such moons have never formed naturally.

However, the orbit (and close distance to its star) of Kepler-61b may play a key in preventing it and the hypothetical moon from being habitable. The eccentricity of the planet is 0.25, which means it has an elliptical orbit. These temperatures may vary if Kepler-61b has an intense greenhouse effect, resulting in the planet being too hot to support liquid water altogether.

Discovery
In 2009, NASA's Kepler spacecraft was completing observing stars on its photometer, the instrument it uses to detect transit events, in which a planet crosses in front of and dims its host star for a brief and roughly regular period of time. In this last test, Kepler observed  stars in the Kepler Input Catalog, including Kepler-61; the preliminary light curves were sent to the Kepler science team for analysis, who chose obvious planetary companions from the bunch for follow-up at observatories. The radial velocity observations confirmed that a planetary body was responsible for the dips observed in Kepler-61's light curve, thus confirming it as a planet. It was announced on April 24, 2013.

See also
Gliese 832 c – similar exoplanet in the habitable zone with an eccentric orbit with various temperature swings

References

External links
Notes on planet Kepler-61b, Extrasolar Planet Encyclopedia
Kepler mission discoveries

Exoplanets discovered in 2013
Transiting exoplanets
Exoplanets discovered by the Kepler space telescope
Super-Earths in the habitable zone
Kepler-61
Cygnus (constellation)